The 2018 United States House of Representatives elections in Kansas were held on November 6, 2018, to elect the four U.S. representatives from the state of Kansas, one from each of the state's four congressional districts.

The state congressional delegation changed from a 4–0 Republican majority to a 3–1 Republican majority, the first time the Democrats held a house seat in the state since 2010.

Overview
Results of the 2018 United States House of Representatives elections in Kansas by district:

District 1

The first district is one of the largest geographically in the nation, encompassing more than half of the area of the state. It is located in western and northern Kansas, and includes the cities of Manhattan and Salina. Republican Roger Marshall won this district in 2016 by defeating the incumbent Congressman, Tim Huelskamp, in the Republican primary 57% to 43% and winning the general election.

Republican primary
Tim Huelskamp filed a statement of candidacy with the FEC on October 17, 2016, to run for this seat in 2018. Huelskamp made no announcement about whether he is considering a potential rematch with Marshall, but sent a fundraising email attacking Marshall and soliciting donations. On June 29, 2017, it was announced that Huelskamp had accepted a position with The Heartland Institute, a conservative think tank in Arlington Heights, Illinois.

Candidates

Nominee
Roger Marshall, incumbent U.S. Representative

Eliminated in primary
Nick Reinecker

Declined
Tim Huelskamp, former U.S. Representative

Primary results

Democratic primary

Candidates

Nominee
Alan LaPolice, former school administrator, Republican candidate for this seat in 2014 and an Independent candidate in 2016.

Primary results

General election

Endorsements

Polling

Results

District 2

This district is located in eastern Kansas and is anchored by the state capital, Topeka. It also includes the city of Lawrence. Incumbent Republican Lynn Jenkins had represented the district since 2009. She had beaten former six-term District congressman Jim Ryun in the primary, and incumbent Democrat, Nancy Boyda, in the general election. Jenkins was re-elected with 61% of the vote in 2016.

Republican primary

Campaign
Jenkins had considered running for governor instead of re-election, but decided to retire and not run for any office in 2018.

Army veteran Steve Watkins led the Republican primary campaign, securing the endorsement of current President Donald Trump. However, his background and residency were challenged by fellow Republicans, citing inaccuracies in claims on his website and in his campaign, as well as his absence from the district.

Candidates

Nominee
 Steve Watkins, army veteran, dog racer and engineer

Eliminated in primary
 Vernon Fields, Basehor City Councilman
 Steve Fitzgerald, state senator
 Kevin Jones, state representative
 Doug Mays, former Kansas House speaker
 Dennis Pyle, state senator
 Caryn Tyson, state senator

Withdrawn
 Matt Bevens
 Tyler Tannahill

Endorsements

Primary results

Democratic primary
Former Kansas State House Minority Leader and 2014 gubernatorial nominee Paul Davis ran unopposed. When Davis ran against incumbent governor Sam Brownback in 2014, he had carried the 2nd district.

Candidates

Nominee
 Paul Davis, former Minority Leader of the Kansas House of Representatives and nominee for Governor in 2014

Withdrawn
 Nathan Schmidt

Primary results

Libertarian primary

Candidates

Nominee
Kelly Standley, business developer

General election

Endorsements

Debates
Complete video of debate, October 18, 2018

Polling

Predictions

Results

District 3

The district is based in the Kansas City metropolitan area and surrounding suburbs in eastern Kansas. Cities include Kansas City and Overland Park. Incumbent Republican Kevin Yoder had represented the district since 2011.  Yoder was re-elected with 51% of the vote in 2016. Yoder lost to his Democratic challenger, attorney Sharice Davids, who became one of the first Native American women ever elected to Congress.

Republican primary

Candidates

Nominee
 Kevin Yoder, incumbent representative

Eliminated in primary
 Trevor Keegan
 Joe Myers

Primary results

Democratic primary

Candidates

Nominee
Sharice Davids, attorney, mixed martial artist, and former White House Fellow

Eliminated in primary
 Mike McCamon, businessman
 Tom Niermann, teacher
 Jay Sidie, financial counselor and nominee for this seat in 2016
 Brent Welder, attorney
 Sylvia Williams, former financial services manager

Withdrawn
 Chris Haulmark (dropped out to run for the Kansas House of Representatives)
 Reggie Marselus, retired union official and candidate for this seat in 2014 & 2016
 Joe McConnell, businessman and Iraq War veteran
 Andrea Ramsey, attorney and former healthcare executive

Endorsements

Polling

Primary results

General election

Endorsements

Polling

Predictions

Results

District 4

The fourth district is based in southern Kansas, including Wichita and the surrounding suburbs. Incumbent Republican Ron Estes has represented the district since 2017. Estes was elected with 52.5% of the vote in 2017.

Prior to Estes, Mike Pompeo represented the district. Pompeo had been nominated as Director of the Central Intelligence Agency in the Donald Trump administration. After Pompeo was confirmed, a special election was held for the remainder of Pompeo's term. Ron Estes won the special election on April 11, 2017.

Republican primary
The Republican Party selected a nominee during a Republican Party primary election which took place on August 7, 2018. The Republican primary was open to registered voters who were either unaffiliated or registered as Republicans.

Candidates

Nominee
Ron Estes, incumbent U.S. Representative

Eliminated in primary
 Ron M. Estes (different candidate with similar name), high level manager at Boeing for 40 years including working on the International Space Station project

Declined
Susan Wagle, Kansas Senate President

Campaign
Because there were two Republican candidates named Ron Estes, the names appeared on the ballot as "Rep. Ron Estes" and "Ron M. Estes", which some criticized as breaking state law that prohibits identifying an incumbent on the ballot.

Primary results

Democratic primary
The Democratic Party selected a nominee during a Democratic Party primary election that took place on August 7, 2018. The primary was open to registered voters who were either unaffiliated or registered as Democrats.

Candidates

Nominee
James Thompson, civil rights attorney, military veteran and nominee for this seat in 2017

Eliminated in primary
 Laura Lombard, businesswoman and CEO of ImEpik (online workforce training services)

Campaign
Senator Bernie Sanders and Alexandria Ocasio-Cortez campaigned for Democrat James Thompson on July 20, 2018, after the national Democratic party would not support him. Laura Lombard criticized the state's decision to list incumbent Ron Estes as "Rep. Ron Estes" on the ballot, because she believes it breaks state laws which prohibit a candidate from being identified as an incumbent on the ballot.

Endorsements

Primary results

General election

Endorsements

Polling

Results

References

External links
Candidates at Vote Smart
Candidates at Ballotpedia
Campaign finance at FEC
Campaign finance at OpenSecrets

Official campaign websites of first district candidates
Alan LaPolice (D) for Congress
Roger Marshall (R) for Congress

Official campaign websites of second district candidates
Paul Davis (D) for Congress
Steve Watkins (R) for Congress 

Official campaign websites of third district candidates
Sharice Davids (D) for Congress
Kevin Yoder (R) for Congress

Official campaign websites of fourth district candidates
Ron Estes (R) for Congress
James Thompson (D) for Congress

Kansas
2018
House